Vipin Kumar (born 10 January 1996) is an Indian cricketer. He made his Twenty20 debut on 18 November 2019, for Haryana in the 2019–20 Syed Mushtaq Ali Trophy. He made his first-class debut on 11 January 2020, for Haryana in the 2019–20 Ranji Trophy.

References

External links
 

1996 births
Living people
Indian cricketers
Haryana cricketers
Place of birth missing (living people)